DZRH-TV was the flagship VHF TV station of Philippine media network Manila Broadcasting Company that aired from April 11, 1962, to September 23, 1972, and had relay stations in 6 key cities in the Philippines. Its studios were located at the old Jai Alai Building. It was one of the TV stations were shut down permanently during the declaration of martial law by President Ferdinand Marcos.

History

Pioneer operators of channel 11
DZRH-TV went on air on April 11, 1962, on Channel 11, the last of the VHF assignments in Metro Manila. It was a general entertainment formatted channel until Metrocom forces forced the TV station along with DZRH AM 650 and other assets to cease operations at the wake of the declaration of Martial Law. The status of the pre-Martial law program archives of TV 11 is unknown.

Failed bid of restoration
After the 1986 People Power Revolution, MBC attempted channel 11 frequency to bring it back on the air; however in January 1992, the NTC disqualified them for a VHF frequency application because the agency found MBC as they are "not legally, technically and financially qualified to operate the station." As a result, the channel 11 frequency license was eventually acquired by El Shaddai-led Delta Broadcasting System, Inc. in 1995, with the frequency's new callsign DWXI-TV. DBS later moved to channel 35, when ZOE Broadcasting Network (through its head Jesus Is Lord Church leader Brother Eddie Villanueva) bought the channel 11 spot from DBS in 1998 and became DZOE-TV, which was occupied by GMA News TV (formerly QTV/Q), but discontinued operations since June 5, 2019, due to the blocktime agreement between ZOE Broadcasting Network and GMA Network was not renewed, so GMA News TV was moved to DWDB-TV Channel 27 (now renamed as GTV since February 22, 2021), for the remainder of the analog transmission run, then Channel 11 became affiliated with ABS-CBN as A2Z, 5 months after channel 2's shutdown due to a cease and desist order issued by the National Telecommunications Commission for an expired franchise on May 5, 2020, and their frequencies were later recalled.

Ironically, MBC was one of the two remaining pre-Martial Law TV operators who did not revive at the height of the sequestrations that were done months after the 1986 Revolution, along with ABC-5, that did not yet resume until commencing test broadcasts in 1991 and relaunching the following year with different calls, DWET-TV; and a different corporate name, Associated Broadcasting Company, instead of keeping the original Corporation and its original calls, DZTM-TV during the pre-martial law years; as a result of the new management under Edward Tan that took over upon the revival of Channel 5.

MBC returned to TV, albeit on cable as DZRH RadyoVision in 2007 and is currently branded as DZRH News Television. MBC regards the cable channel as a linear descendant of the original TV 11.

TV shows

Straight from the Shoulder (1970–1972, moved to GMA News and Public Affairs from 1987 to 1994)
Darigold Jamboree
DJ Dance Time
Gabi ng Lagim (TV version)
Ano Ang Balita (1962-1972)
The Nite Owl Dance Party
Etchos Lang (Justo Justo)
Catch Up with Tirso (1970)
Etcetera, Etcetera (sitcom) (1967)
Aking Talaarawan
Reyna ng Tahanan
Balitang Barbero (1965)
MICAA Basketball Games
Your Esso Reporter

See also
Manila Broadcasting Company
DZRH
RHTV
DZOE-TV

References

Manila Broadcasting Company
Defunct television stations in the Philippines
Television stations in Metro Manila
Television channels and stations established in 1962
Television channels and stations disestablished in 1972